Thai massage or Thai yoga massage is a traditional therapy combining acupressure, Indian Ayurvedic principles, and assisted yoga postures. The idea of Sen-lines alias energy-lines was first used as "Thai yoga massage". These are similar to nadis as per the philosophy of yoga by Gorakhnath. 

In the Thai language, it is usually called nuat phaen thai (lit. 'Thai-style massage') or nuat phaen boran (lit. 'ancient-style massage'), though its formal name is nuat thai (lit. 'Thai massage') according to the Traditional Thai Medical Professions Act, BE 2556 (2013). 

The Thai Ministry of Public Health's Department for Development of Thai Traditional and Alternative Medicine regulates Thai traditional massage venues and practitioners.  the department says 913 traditional clinics have been registered nationwide in Thailand. , of the 8,000 to 10,000 spa and massage shops in Thailand; only 4,228 are certified by the Health Ministry's Department of Health Service Support (HSS).

UNESCO added traditional Thai massage to its Cultural Heritage of Humanity list in December 2019.

Practice
The practice of Thai yoga massage is said to be thousands of years old, but it is still part of Thailand's medical system due to its perceived healing properties at both emotional and physical levels. There are differences in certain practices associated with massage when performed in the Western and Thai contexts. Western cultural sensibilities might be different in terms of accepting shamanic healing practices such as increasing the intensity of the massage or the giver jumping around the massage table like the Hindu god Hanuman. Traditional Thai massage uses no oils or lotions. The recipient remains clothed during treatment. There is constant body contact between the giver and receiver, but rather than rubbing on muscles, the body is compressed, pulled, stretched and rocked. The concept of metta (loving-kindness), based on Buddhist teachings, is an integral part of this practice. Well-known practitioners also emphasize meditation and devotion on a part of the practitioner as integral to the effectiveness of this practice.

The recipient wears loose, comfortable clothing and lies on a mat or firm mattress on the floor. In Thailand, a dozen or so subjects may receive massage simultaneously in one large room. The true ancient style of the massage requires that the massage be performed solo with just the giver and receiver. The receiver will be positioned in a variety of yoga-like positions during the course of the massage, which is also combined with deep static and rhythmic pressures.

The massage generally follows designated lines ("sen") in the body. The legs and feet of the giver can be used to position the body or limbs of the recipient. In other positions, hands fix the body, while the feet do the massaging. A full Thai massage session may last two hours and includes rhythmic pressing and stretching of the entire body. This may include pulling fingers, toes, ears, cracking knuckles, walking on the recipient's back, by palm-press, thumb-press, fingers-press and forearm-press in many different positions including HDS. There is a standard procedure and rhythm to the massage, which the giver will adjust to fit the receiver.

History

The founder of Thai massage and medicine is said to have been Chiwaka Komaraphat (ชีวกโกมารภัจจ์ Jīvaka Komarabhācca), who is said in the Pāli Buddhist canon to have been the Buddha's physician over 2,500 years ago. He is recorded in ancient documents as having extraordinary medical skills, his knowledge of herbal medicine, and for having treated important people of his day, including the Buddha himself.

In fact, the history of Thai massage is more complex than this legend of a single founder would suggest. Thai massage, like Thai traditional medicine (TTM)  more generally, is a combination of influences from Indian and Southeast Asian traditions of medicine, and the art as it is practiced today is likely to be the product of a 19th-century synthesis of various healing traditions from all over the kingdom. Even today, there is considerable variation from region to region across Thailand, and no single routine or theoretical framework that is universally accepted among healers.

Training
A licensed, traditional massage practitioner is required to complete at least 800 hours training. Massage therapists must acquire a professional license and must register at the Public Health Ministry's Department of Health Service Support (HSS). To qualify for a license, therapists must be trained in courses created by the HSS. The standard courses are provided free. Alternatively, students can go to one of the 181 schools nationwide approved to train therapists using standard HSS courses.

Wat Pho, the center of Thai medicine and massage for centuries, opened the Wat Pho Thai Traditional Medical and Massage School in 1955 on the temple grounds, the first such school approved by the Thai Ministry of Education. Wat Pho offers four basic courses of Thai medicine: Thai massage, Thai midwife-nurse, Thai pharmacy, and Thai medical practice.

Thai massage is also taught and practiced in other countries. Some schools have merged the course material to include understanding of clinical approach like chiropractic adjustment, posture assessment along with energy balance to give a complete understanding of Thai yoga bodywork. This trend has led to opening new schools in Europe, India and Nepal.

Effectiveness
All types of massage, including Thai massage, can help people relax, temporarily relieve muscle and/or joint pain, and temporarily boost a person's mood. However, many practitioners' claims go far beyond those effects well demonstrated by clinical study. Some clinicians dispute its efficacy.

Dangers
According to the Thai Public Health Ministry, massage can be dangerous for women at different stages of pregnancy. A physician at the Department of Thai Traditional and Alternative Medicine cautioned that women in their first trimester "should avoid massage because it may lead to miscarriage." Those who are more than six months into their pregnancy should "also be cautious about getting a massage." The warnings came on the heels of a case where a pregnant 25-year-old suffered a miscarriage and fell into a coma while getting a foot massage.

Massage and sex services
Massage is big business in Thailand. It is regulated by the Ministry of Public Health . The Commerce and Tourism and Sports Ministries have set a target of 20 billion baht per year to be generated by the spa business, but only 500 of the estimated 2,000 spas nationwide are legally registered with the authorities. The legal difference between a "spa" and a "massage parlour" is unclear. The Federation of Thai Spa Associations (FTSPA) in 2016 urged authorities to clamp down on sexual services being offered at some massage parlours. The FTSPA maintains that influential figures have used legal loopholes to open "pretty spas" or massage parlours where clients can buy sexual services.

References

Manual therapy
Traditional medicine
Thai culture
Massage therapy
Masterpieces of the Oral and Intangible Heritage of Humanity